is a Japanese manga artist and character designer.

Biography 
Kubonouchi made his professional career debut in 1986 with the short story Okappiki Eiji published in the manga magazine Shōnen Sunday. From 1988 to 1991, he worked on his first series, Tsurumoku Dokushin Ryō, which was in 1991 made into a movie with Kōyō Maeda (ja) in the leading role. His second manga series, Watanabe, was made into a television series in 1993, directed by Kiyoshi Kurosawa. After a 7-year hiatus, Kubonouchi began Chocolat, a story about a former mob boss, just having been released from the prison, who befriends a 16-year-old girl. Chocolat was published from October 1999 to September 2003 in Big Comic Spirits.  In 2003, the manga was made into a television drama, that lasted 45 episodes.

Works

Other works

References

External links 
 
  Interview with Eisaku Kubonouchi about dramatizing Chocolat (Web Archive)
  List of Eisaku Kubonouchi's works at Shogakukan official site
 

1966 births
Living people
Manga artists from Kōchi Prefecture